The Hits is the second compilation album, and first wide-released greatest hits album, from American country music artist Garth Brooks, released on December 13, 1994, by Liberty.

Brooks first greatest hits album, The Garth Brooks Collection, was released three months earlier exclusively at McDonald's restaurants for a limited time to raise money for the Ronald McDonald Children's Charities.

The Hits is now out of print due to Brooks' views for whole record sales, instead of albums of singles. He insisted it only be available for a limited time, but not before it sold well over 10 million copies (which at that time became his first album to achieve Diamond Series).

The album debuted at #1 on the Billboard 200, and Top Country Albums. A CD Zoom containing 20-second sound bites of 61 songs accompanied The Hits. In June 1995, the master was buried under Brooks’ star on the Hollywood Walk of Fame.

Track listing

Charts
The Hits debuted at #1 on the U.S. Billboard 200, becoming his fourth, and #1 on the Top Country Albums, becoming his fifth #1 Country album. In November 1998, The Hits was certified 10× Platinum by the RIAA.

Weekly charts

Year-end charts

Decade-end charts

Certifications

References

1994 greatest hits albums
Garth Brooks compilation albums
Liberty Records compilation albums
Albums produced by Allen Reynolds
Canadian Country Music Association Top Selling Album albums